In mathematics, the Burkhardt quartic is a quartic threefold in 4-dimensional projective space studied by , 
with the maximum possible number of 45 nodes.

Definition
The equations defining the Burkhardt quartic become simpler if it is embedded in P5 rather than P4.
In this case it can be defined by the equations σ1 = σ4 = 0, where σi is the ith elementary symmetric function of the coordinates (x0 : x1 : x2 : x3 : x4 : x5) of P5.

Properties
The automorphism group of the Burkhardt quartic is the Burkhardt group U4(2) = PSp4(3), a simple group of order 25920, which is isomorphic to a subgroup of index 2 in the Weyl group of E6.

The Burkhardt quartic is rational and furthermore birationally equivalent to a compactification of the Siegel modular variety A2(3).

References

External links

3-folds